Martha and Maurice Ostheimer Estate is a historic home located in West Whiteland Township, Chester County, Pennsylvania. The estate home known as "Grimmet" was designed by architect John Gilbert McIlvaine, a partner of Wilson Eyre, and built in 1924 in the Tudor Revival style.  It was expanded in 1952. The house has been converted to office use. The property includes the previously listed Wee Grimmet, built about 1820, and expanded about 1929 by McIlvaine.  The property also includes a contributing small stone arch bridge, a terraced landscape, and the site of a 19th-century limestone quarry and kiln. Martha Gibson McIlvain Ostheimer was one of three founders of the Herb Society of America, and her Herb Gardens west and southwest of Grimmet were well known among herbalists until 1962.

It was listed on the National Register of Historic Places in 1995.

References

Houses on the National Register of Historic Places in Pennsylvania
Tudor Revival architecture in Pennsylvania
Houses completed in 1924
Houses in Chester County, Pennsylvania
National Register of Historic Places in Chester County, Pennsylvania